The 1962 Nebraska gubernatorial election was held on November 6, 1962, and featured incumbent Governor Frank B. Morrison, a Democrat, defeating Republican nominee, former U.S. Secretary of the Interior Fred A. Seaton, to win a second two-year term in office.

Democratic primary

Candidates
Darleene Day Brooks, widow of former Governor Ralph G. Brooks
Tony Mangiamelli
Frank B. Morrison, incumbent Governor

Results

Republican primary

Candidates
George A. Clarke, businessman and rancher
Louis H. Hector
Fred A. Seaton, former U.S. Senator and Secretary of the Interior

Results

General election

Results

References

Gubernatorial
1962
Nebraska
November 1962 events in the United States